Vingtaine de la Croiserie is one of the five vingtaines of Trinity in the Channel Island of Jersey.

References

Croiserie
Croiserie